Number Forms is a Unicode block containing Unicode compatibility characters that have specific meaning as numbers, but are constructed from other characters.  They consist primarily of vulgar fractions and Roman numerals. In addition to the characters in the Number Forms block, three fractions were inherited from ISO-8859-1, which was incorporated whole as the Latin-1 Supplement block.

List of characters

Block

History
The following Unicode-related documents record the purpose and process of defining specific characters in the Number Forms block:

See also

 Latin script in Unicode
 Unicode symbols

References

Symbols
Unicode
Unicode blocks